The research activities of the Institute of Chemistry of the Slovak Academy of Sciences are aimed at the chemistry and biochemistry of saccharides. The main fields of interest may be classified into the following directions:

 Synthesis and structure of biologically important mono- and oligosaccharides and their derivatives
 Structure and functional properties of polysaccharides, their derivatives, and conjugates with other polymers
 Structure, function, and mechanism of action of glycanases
 Development of physicochemical methods for structural analysis of carbohydrates
 Gene engineering and nutritional and biologically active proteins
 Glycobiotechnology
 Ecology, taxonomy, and phylogenesis of yeasts and yeasts-like fungi
 Development of technologies for isolation of natural compounds and preparation of saccharides and their derivatives for commercial purposes

References

Biochemistry research institutes
Slovak Academy of Sciences